William Francis Hagerty IV (born August 14, 1959) is an American politician, businessman, and  diplomat serving as the junior United States senator from Tennessee since 2021. A member of the Republican Party, he served as the 30th United States ambassador to Japan from 2017 to 2019 under President Donald Trump.

Hagerty worked as an economic advisor and White House fellow under President George H. W. Bush. He then began a career in private equity. Hagerty is the co-founder of Hagerty Peterson & Company, a private equity investment firm; he is a former managing director of the firm. From 2011 to 2014, Hagerty served as commissioner of the Tennessee Department of Economic and Community Development. He led a successful effort to bring a Major League Soccer franchise to Nashville. President Donald Trump nominated Hagerty to serve as U.S. ambassador to Japan on March 27, 2017; he was confirmed by the U.S. Senate on July 13, 2017, in an 86–12 vote. Hagerty was sworn in as the 30th United States ambassador to Japan on July 27, 2017; he resigned in July 2019 to run for the U.S. Senate.

Hagerty ran in the 2020 election for the U.S. Senate seat being vacated by Lamar Alexander. He won the Republican primary and defeated Democratic nominee Marquita Bradshaw in the general election.

Early life and education
Hagerty is a native of Gallatin, in Sumner County, Tennessee. He became an Eagle Scout, and was awarded the Distinguished Eagle Scout Award in 2017. He is a 1977 graduate of Madisonville North Hopkins High School in Kentucky. He earned a Bachelor of Arts in economics and business administration in 1981 from Vanderbilt University and a Juris Doctor from Vanderbilt Law School in 1984.

Career 

Hagerty began his career at Boston Consulting Group, culminating in a three-year assignment to Tokyo. He was an economic advisor and White House Fellow in the administration of President George H. W. Bush and then began a career in private equity, initially at Trident Capital in Silicon Valley. Hagerty is the co-founder of Hagerty Peterson & Company, a private equity investment firm; he is a former managing director of the firm. He served as a national finance chair for Mitt Romney's 2008 presidential campaign.

From 2011 to 2014, Hagerty served as commissioner of the Tennessee Department of Economic and Community Development in the cabinet of Governor Bill Haslam, where he played a role in investments by Bridgestone, Calsonic Kansei (now Magneti Marelli), and Nissan in Tennessee.

Hagerty has served on the board of CyMed, NEW Customer Services, Houghton Mifflin Harcourt, Ryman Hospitality, Pinnacle Financial Partners, and R.J. O'Brien.

Nashville MLS Steering Committee 
Before his confirmation as U.S. Ambassador to Japan, Hagerty founded and led the Nashville MLS Steering Committee, a coalition seeking to bring a Major League Soccer franchise to Nashville, Tennessee. The effort was successful, with Nashville being officially selected and named the first of two new MLS expansion markets on December 20, 2017. Nashville SC debuted in the 2020 MLS season.

2016 presidential election 
During the early stages of the 2016 presidential election, Hagerty was nominated to serve on the ballot as a delegate for Jeb Bush. Bush dropped out of the race before the Tennessee primary on March 1, 2016. After the Tennessee primary, Hagerty served as Trump Victory Chair for Tennessee. After Trump became the Republican nominee, he was selected in August 2016 as director of appointments for Trump's presidential transition team.

United States Ambassador to Japan 

Trump nominated Hagerty to be the United States Ambassador to Japan on March 27, 2017. He was confirmed by the United States Senate on July 13, 2017, in an 86–12 vote. He was sworn in as the 30th U.S. Ambassador on July 27, 2017.

Before his confirmation, Hagerty was reportedly also under consideration for  United States Trade Representative, based on his prior international trade and U.S. foreign investment experience. The job eventually went to Robert Lighthizer, an attorney and former Reagan Administration official.

On July 16, 2019, Hagerty announced that he would resign as Ambassador to Japan to run for the Senate.

U.S. Senate

2020 

In December 2018, U.S. Senator Lamar Alexander announced that he would not run for a fourth term. When asked about possible successors, Alexander named Hagerty and former governor Bill Haslam as the "most obvious" candidates. On July 11, 2019, Haslam announced that he would not run for the Senate. The next day, Trump tweeted that Hagerty would resign as ambassador to Japan to run for the open Senate seat. In the same tweet, Trump endorsed Hagerty for Senate. Hagerty was mentioned as a potential U.S. secretary of state during the same period.

Hagerty officially launched his Senate campaign in September 2019. By the end of the month, he had raised $1.9 million for his campaign. By April 6, Hagerty had raised more than $7 million, with $1.2 million raised in the first quarter of 2020. Speakers at Hagerty campaign fundraisers included Donald Trump Jr., Kimberly Guilfoyle, and Nikki Haley.

Beginning in late May 2020, news outlets began circulating an article, originally published by Roger Sollenberger in Salon, discussing allegations of campaign finance misconduct by Hagerty. The article focused largely on a loan given to the Hagerty Campaign by Pinnacle Financial Partners almost immediately following the Coronavirus Aid, Relief and Economic Security Act.

On August 6, 2020, Hagerty won the Republican primary. He defeated Democratic nominee Marquita Bradshaw in the November general election, 1,840,926 votes to 1,040,691. Hagerty took office on January 3, 2021.

Senate tenure
Hagerty initially planned to object to certifying the 2021 United States Electoral College vote count over unsubstantiated claims of voter fraud. But after Trump supporters stormed the U.S. Capitol, he changed his mind and voted to certify the count. On May 28, 2021, Hagerty voted against creating an independent commission to investigate the Capitol attack.

In August 2021, Hagerty used a procedural maneuver to grind the final vote on the $1 trillion Infrastructure Investment and Jobs Act to a halt, citing the expense and the upcoming $3.5 trillion reconciliation bill. His actions drew the ire of both Democratic and Republican senators, with Democrats accusing Hagerty of doing Trump's bidding and Republicans such as Mitt Romney and Kevin Cramer showing frustration.

Committees
Committee on Banking, Housing, and Urban Affairs
Committee on Foreign Relations
Committee on Appropriations
Committee on Rules and Administration

Political positions
Hagerty is a self-described conservative. His views have been characterized as populist and in line with Trump's political views.

During his 2020 Senate campaign, Hagerty resigned from the board of futures brokerage R.J. O'Brien & Associates after an opponent claimed the firm was donating money to the Black Lives Matter Foundation, an organization of which Hagerty is critical. He was also called "entitled" for acquiring a $2.5 million loan to his campaign from Pinnacle Bank (where he had formerly been a director) at a time when small businesses were having difficulty getting federal stimulus loans during the COVID-19 pandemic.

Hagerty supports the death penalty for people convicted of engaging in human trafficking acts. He believes that Sharia Law is a national security threat to the U.S. and that the U.S. should continue to support Israel. Hagerty supports reducing taxes and supports enacting a balanced budget amendment to the Constitution of the United States. He opposes raising the federal minimum wage. Hagerty opposes the Patient Protection and Affordable Care Act, and believes that the federal government should reduce its involvement in health care. He supports efforts to prevent the closure of rural hospitals. Hagerty supports increased investment and development of fossil fuels, and supports repealing renewable energy and energy efficiency standards. He also supports American energy independence.

Personal life
Hagerty is married to Chrissy Hagerty, and has four children. He identifies as a conservative Christian.

Electoral history

References

External links 

 Bill Hagerty official U.S. Senate website
 Bill Hagerty for U.S. Senate campaign website
 
 
 Bill Hagerty at On the Issues
 

|-

|-

|-

|-

 

1959 births
20th-century American businesspeople
21st-century American businesspeople
21st-century American diplomats
21st-century American politicians
Ambassadors of the United States to Japan
Boston Consulting Group people
Businesspeople from Tennessee
Christians from Tennessee
Living people
People from Gallatin, Tennessee
Politicians from Nashville, Tennessee
Private equity and venture capital investors
Republican Party United States senators from Tennessee
State cabinet secretaries of Tennessee
Tennessee Republicans
Trump administration personnel
Vanderbilt University Law School alumni